Burlington is an unincorporated community in Fulton County, in the U.S. state of Ohio.

History
Burlington was laid out in 1839. A post office was moved from nearby Elmira to Burlington about 1850 but the name of the post office was not changed. The "Elmira" post office closed in 1957.

References

Unincorporated communities in Fulton County, Ohio
Unincorporated communities in Ohio